The Asia-Oceania Floorball Cup (AOFC) is a biennial floorball tournament for men and women and is organized by the Asia Oceania Floorball Confederation. It succeeds the Asia Pacific Floorball Championships.

Results

Men

Women

Participation
Men's

Women's

See also 
List of Asia Pacific Floorball champions

References

External links
http://www.floorball.org/pages/EN/AOFC-Cup

Floorball competitions
Floorball_Cup
Recurring sporting events established in 2017